L'Aldosa de la Massana, known simply as L'Aldosa, is a village in Andorra, located in the parish of La Massana.  

Populated places in Andorra
La Massana